Giadalla Azzuz Belgassem Ettalhi (born 1939) is a Libyan politician and diplomat.

Ettalhi was a government minister of Libya throughout the 1990s and in the early 1980s during the era of the Libyan Arab Jamahiriya. His posts included Minister of Communications, Minister of Industry, Minister of Industry and Mineral Resources, Minister of Foreign Affairs, Minister of Strategic Industries (1990–94), Secretary of the Great Man-Made River Project (1994–98), and Minister of Planning (1998–2000). Ettalhi was the Secretary of the General People's Committee from 1979 to 1984 and from 1986 to 1987.

In 2007, Ettalhi became Libya's Permanent Representative to the United Nations in New York. In this capacity, he was the President of the United Nations Security Council in January 2008. He was Libya's Permanent Representative to the UN until January 2009.

Ettalhi was educated as a geologist and mining engineer at the University of Liège.

References
"New Permanent Representative of Libya Presents Credentials", 2007-04-30, UN Doc BIO/3868.

1939 births
Living people
Government ministers of Libya
Libyan diplomats
Permanent Representatives of Libya to the United Nations
University of Liège alumni
Members of the General People's Committee of Libya
Foreign ministers of Libya